Mol (Eng: Value) is a 2015 Pakistani television series based on the story by Faysal Manzoor that airs on Hum TV. It is produced by Momina Duraid under MD Productions. It has Faysal Qureshi, Naveen Waqar and Iqra Aziz in leads. At 16th Lux Style Awards, series receive nomination for Best original soundtrack to Bushra Bilal.

Plot
Mol is essentially about balancing the rights of the individual with the demands of society. Shahryar Hassan's (Faysal Qureshi) family insists he marry his much younger cousin Sajal (Iqra Aziz), and in his desperation to escape a union he has absolutely no interest in, he applies for a transfer from Karachi to the provincial but ancient city of Sukkur. As a Deputy Commissioner, he meets Imtiaz Saheb (Munawer Saeed), his subordinate in Sukkur, and asks to learns about the special secrets that every city is said to hold. A chance meeting with Imtiaz Saheb's daughter Emaan, a teacher at a school for special needs children, sets up a chain of events that lead to their marriage. Shahryar's father (Nadeem) and mother (Ismat Zaidi) are reluctant witnesses to the event, leaving immediately after the Nikkah and disowning their son while outright rejecting any connection with Emaan whom they consider an unwelcome usurper of their own choice, Sajal.

Cast
 Faysal Qureshi as Shehreyar
 Naveen Waqar as Emaan 
 Iqra Aziz as Sajjal
 Nadeem Baig as Humayun 
 Ismat Zaidi as Shehreyar's mother
 Adnan Jaffar as Rohail Hayat  
 Zainab Qayyum as Sanober (Rohail's wife)
 Rahma Ali as Sonia
 Minal Khan as Ghazia
 Munawar Saeed as Imtiaz
 Fariya Hassan as Sonia

Awards

References

External links
 Official Hum TV Website

Hum TV original programming
Urdu-language television shows
Pakistani drama television series
2015 Pakistani television series debuts
2015 Pakistani television series endings